FRPD may refer to:

 Federal Reserve Police
 Forumi Rinor i Partise Demokratike